The 2000 Singer Triangular Series was an ODI cricket tournament held in Sri Lanka from 5 to 14 July 2000. It featured the national cricket teams of South Africa, Pakistan and the hosts, Sri Lanka. The competition was won by Sri Lanka, which defeated South Africa in the final.

Background

Squads

Points table
The tournament was organised in a round robin format, with each team playing each other twice.

Matches

Final

Records and awards
Jack

References

External links
 Tournament home at ESPN Cricinfo

2000 in Sri Lankan cricket
International cricket competitions from 1997–98 to 2000
Cricket